Tomáš Pilík (born 20 December 1988 in Příbram) is a professional Czech footballer, who played for 1. FK Příbram.

At the age of just 15 years and 343 days, Pilík made his Czech First League debut for Příbram in a match against Blšany, making him the second-youngest player in the history of the league after Pavel Mezlík.

In an August 2005 2–1 win against Brno, Pilík scored his first Czech First League goal at the age of 16, becoming the youngest goal scorer in league history to date.

References

External links
 
 
 Guardian Football

Czech footballers
Association football midfielders
1988 births
Living people
Sportspeople from Příbram
Czech First League players
1. FK Příbram players
FC Zbrojovka Brno players
FC Baník Ostrava players
Budapest Honvéd FC players
FK Jablonec players
Czech expatriate footballers
Expatriate footballers in Hungary
Czech expatriate sportspeople in Hungary
Nemzeti Bajnokság I players
Czech National Football League players